Matsudagawa Dam is a gravity dam located in Tochigi prefecture in Japan. The dam is used for flood control and water supply. The catchment area of the dam is 4 km2. The dam impounds about 11  ha of land when full and can store 1900 thousand cubic meters of water. The construction of the dam was started on 1981 and completed in 1995.

References

Dams in Tochigi Prefecture
1995 establishments in Japan